Kenneth Eric Allaby (born August 7, 1943 on Grand Manan Island, New Brunswick) is a former New Brunswick politician.

He first ran for the Legislative Assembly of New Brunswick, as a Liberal in the 1982 election but was defeated. He ran and won in the 1987 election in which Frank McKenna's Liberal party captured every seat. He was re-elected in 1991, 1995, 1999 and 2003.

In 2007, he was named to the board of directors for the New Brunswick Provincial Capital Commission.

References 
 New Brunswick MLAs, New Brunswick Legislative Library (pdf)

1943 births
Living people
Canadian underwater divers
New Brunswick Liberal Association MLAs
People from Grand Manan
Writers from New Brunswick
21st-century Canadian politicians